Verizon Communications Inc., commonly known as Verizon, is an American multinational telecommunications conglomerate and a corporate component of the Dow Jones Industrial Average. The company is headquartered at 1095 Avenue of the Americas in Midtown Manhattan, New York City, but is incorporated in Delaware.

The company was formed in 1984 as Bell Atlantic as part of the break up of the Bell System into seven companies, each a Regional Bell Operating Company (RBOC), commonly referred to as "Baby Bells". Headquartered in Philadelphia, it originally had an operating area from New Jersey to Virginia.

In 1997, Bell Atlantic expanded into New York and the New England states by merging with fellow Baby Bell NYNEX. While Bell Atlantic was the surviving company, the merged company moved its headquarters from Philadelphia to NYNEX's old headquarters in New York City. In 2000, Bell Atlantic acquired GTE, which operated telecommunications companies across most of the rest of the country not already in Bell Atlantic's footprint.

In 2015, Verizon expanded into content ownership by acquiring AOL, and two years later, it acquired Yahoo! Inc. AOL and Yahoo were amalgamated into a new division named Oath Inc., which was rebranded as Verizon Media in January 2019, and was spun off and rebranded to Yahoo after its sale to Apollo Global Management.

, Verizon is one of three remaining companies with roots in the former Baby Bells. The other two, like Verizon, exist as a result of mergers among fellow former Baby Bell members. SBC Communications bought the Bells' former parent AT&T Corporation and took on the AT&T name, and CenturyLink acquired Qwest (formerly US West) in 2011 and later became Lumen Technologies in 2020.

Verizon's mobile network is the largest wireless carrier in the United States, with 143.3 million subscribers as of the end of Q4 2022. They also sell accessories and gear for mobiles and PC.

History

Bell Atlantic (1984–2000)
In 1983, the US Department of Justice came to a settlement with AT&T Corporation to breakup the Bell System. Bell Atlantic Corporation was created as one of the original "Baby Bell" Regional Bell Operating Companies (RBOCs) in 1984. 

Bell Atlantic's original roster of operating companies included:
The Bell Telephone Company of Pennsylvania
New Jersey Bell 
Diamond State Telephone 
C&P Telephone (itself comprising four subsidiaries)

In 1996, CEO and Chairman Raymond W. Smith orchestrated Bell Atlantic's merger with NYNEX. When it merged, it moved its corporate headquarters from Philadelphia to New York City. NYNEX was consolidated into the Bell Atlantic name by 1997.

Mergers with GTE and Vodafone (2000–2002)

Two months before the Federal Communications Commission (FCC) gave final approval on the formation of Verizon Communications, Bell Atlantic formed Verizon Wireless in a joint venture with the British telecommunications company Vodafone in April 2000. The companies established Verizon Wireless as its own business operated by Bell Atlantic, which owned 55% of the venture. Vodafone retained 45% of the company. The deal was valued at approximately $70 billion and created a mobile carrier with 23 million customers. Verizon Wireless merged Bell Atlantic's wireless network, Vodafone's AirTouch and PrimeCo holdings, and the wireless division of GTE. Due to its size, Verizon Wireless was able to offer national coverage at competitive rates, giving it an advantage over regional providers typical of the time.

Bell Atlantic changed its name to Verizon Communications in June 2000, when the FCC approved the US$64.7 billion merger with telephone company GTE, nearly two years after the deal was proposed in July 1998. The name Verizon derives from the combination of the words , Latin for truth, and horizon. 

The approval came with 25 stipulations to preserve competition between local phone carriers, including investing in new markets and broadband technologies. The new entity was headed by co-CEOs Charles Lee, former CEO of GTE, and Bell Atlantic CEO Ivan Seidenberg.

Verizon became the largest local telephone company in the United States, operating 63 million telephone lines in 40 states. The company also inherited 25 million mobile phone customers. Additionally, Verizon offered internet services and long-distance calling in New York, before expanding long-distance operations to other states.

Approximately 85,000 Verizon workers went on an 18-day labor strike in August 2000 after their union contracts expired. The strike affected quarterly revenues, resulting in Verizon Wireless' postponement of the company's initial public offering (IPO) (the IPO was ultimately cancelled in 2003 because the company no longer needed to raise revenue for Verizon Wireless due to increased profits), and created a backlog of repairs. This strike did not involve all company employees, as mostly line technicians and user technicians of the company are union.

Verizon launched 3G service in 2002, which doubled the Internet speed of the time to 144kb per second. In August 2002, Verizon began offering local, long-distance and mobile calling, as well as Internet service, in a bundle. It was initially only available to customers in New York and Massachusetts.

2003–2005
In June 2003, Verizon Wireless backed an FCC-issued portability requirement that permitted consumers to take their phone numbers with them across carriers. The company gained 1.5 million new subscribers the following quarter, partially due to the rule change. In April 2004, the Dow Jones Industrial Average added Verizon Communications to its stock market index. Verizon replaced telecom competitor AT&T, which had been a part of the index since the Great Depression.

On December 22, 2004, mail servers at Verizon.net were configured not to accept connections from Europe by default in an attempt to reduce spam email that was originating from the region. Individual domains would only be unblocked upon request.

In 2004, Verizon launched its Fios Internet service, which transmits data over fiber optic cables, in Keller, Texas. The company launched Fios TV in September 2005, also in Keller. Twenty percent of qualified homes had signed up by the end of 2004. By January 2006, Fios offered over 350 channels in eight states, including 20 high-definition television channels and video on demand.

In 2005, Verizon launched VCast, a multimedia service that allowed people to download apps, music, ringtones, and videos.

MCI acquisition
In 2005, Verizon began negotiations to purchase long-distance carrier MCI, who accepted the company's initial $6.75 billion offer in February but then received a higher offer from Qwest Communications. Verizon increased its bid to $7.6 billion (or $23.50 a share), which MCI accepted on March 29, 2005. The acquisition gave the company access to MCI's million corporate clients and international holdings, expanding Verizon's presence into global markets. As a result, Verizon Business was established as a new division to serve the company's business and government customers. The FCC approved the deal on November 5, 2005, valuing it at $8.5 billion. Verizon's 2006 revenues rose by as much as 20% following the purchase.

2006–2010
In May 2006, USA Today reported that Verizon, as well as AT&T and BellSouth, had given the National Security Agency landline phone records following the September 11 attacks. That same month, a $50 billion lawsuit was filed by two lawyers on behalf of all Verizon subscribers for privacy violations and to prevent the company from releasing additional records without consent or warrant. Protesters staged the National Day of Out(R)age due in part to the controversy. In 2007, Verizon stated that it fulfilled only "lawful demands" for information, but also acknowledged surrendering customer information to government agencies without court orders or warrants 720 times between 2005 and 2007.

In February 2007, Verizon added a new service to V Cast called V Cast Mobile TV, which took advantage of Verizon's multiple cellular technologies (such as EV-DO) allowing people with high-end devices to watch TV on their device.

In March 2007, Verizon won a lawsuit against Vonage for patent infringement. The three patents named were filed by Bell Atlantic in 1997, and relate to the conversion of IP addresses into phone numbers, a key technology of Vonage's business. The company was awarded US$58 million in damages and future royalties. Vonage later lost an appeal and was ordered to pay Verizon $120 million.

In May 2007, Verizon acquired Cybertrust, a privately held provider of global information security services.

In September 2007, Verizon Wireless reversed a controversial decision to deny NARAL Pro-Choice America a short code through which the organization could text consumers who had signed up for messaging from the group. The company had initially refused the group access to a code by reserving the right to block "controversial or unsavory" messages.

In November 2007, Verizon opened its networks to third party apps and devices for the first time, a decision that allowed it to participate in the FCC's 2008 700 MHz auction of "open access" spectrum. During that auction, the company bid $9.4 billion and won the bulk of national and local licenses for airwaves reaching approximately 469 million people. Verizon utilized the increased spectrum for its 4G service.

In June 2008, Verizon Wireless purchased wireless carrier Alltel for $28.1 billion. The acquisition included 13 million customers, which allowed Verizon Wireless to surpass AT&T in number of customers and reach new markets in rural areas.

In October 2010, Verizon Wireless paid $77.8 million in refunds and FCC penalties for overcharging 15 million customers for data services. The company stated the overcharges were accidental and only amounted to a few dollars per customer.

On February 4, 2010, 4chan began receiving reports from Verizon Wireless customers that they were having difficulties accessing the site's image boards. Administrators of the site found that only traffic on port 80 to the boards.4chan.org domain was affected, leading them to believe the block was intentional. On February 7, 2010, Verizon Wireless confirmed that 4chan.org was "explicitly blocked" after Verizon's security and external experts detected sweep attacks coming from an IP address associated with the 4chan network. Traffic was restored several days later.

In August 2010, the chairmen of Verizon and Google agreed that network neutrality should be defined and limited.

In December 2010, Verizon introduced its 4G LTE network in 38 markets, as well as airports in seven additional cities. The company planned on a three-year continuous expansion of the 4G service.

Selling wirelines (2005–2010 & 2015)
Between 2005 and 2010, Verizon divested wireline operations in several states in order to focus on its wireless, Fios internet and Fios TV businesses. It sold 700,000 lines in Hawaii in 2005, and spun off lines in Maine, New Hampshire and Vermont in January 2007, which were then purchased by FairPoint Communications for $2.72 billion. Verizon also shed its telephone directory business in 2006.

In May 2009, the company spun off wirelines in Arizona, Idaho, Illinois, Indiana, Michigan, Nevada, North Carolina, Ohio, Oregon, South Carolina, Washington, West Virginia, and Wisconsin into a company that then merged with Frontier Communications in a deal valued at $8.6 billion. In 2016, Verizon sold its wireline operations in Texas, Florida, and California to Frontier.

2011–present 

On January 27, 2011, Verizon acquired Terremark, an information technology services company, for $1.4 billion. Ivan Seidenberg retired as Verizon's CEO on August 1, 2011, and was succeeded by Lowell McAdam.

In December 2011, the non-partisan organization Public Campaign criticized Verizon for its tax avoidance procedures after it spent $52.34 million on lobbying while collecting $951 million in tax rebates between 2008 and 2010 and making a profit of $32.5 billion. The same report also criticized Verizon for increasing executive pay by 167% in 2010 for its top five executives while laying off 21,308 workers between 2008 and 2010. However, in its Form 10-K filed with the SEC on February 24, 2012, Verizon reported having paid more than $11.1 billion in taxes (including income, employment and property taxes) from 2009 to 2011. In addition, the company reported in the 10-K that most of the drop in employment since 2008 was due to a voluntary retirement offer.

In June 2012, Verizon purchased Hughes Telematics, a producer of wireless features for automobiles, for $612 million as part of its strategy to expand into new growth areas in its wireless business. The same month, Verizon's E-911 service failed in the aftermath of the June 2012 derecho storm in several northern Virginia suburbs of Washington, D.C., with some problems lasting several days. The FCC conducted an investigation and released a report detailing the problems that led to the failure in January 2013. Verizon reported that it had already addressed or was addressing a number of the issues related to the FCC report, including the causes of generator failures, conducting audits of backup systems, and making its monitoring systems less centralized, although the FCC indicated that Verizon still needed to make additional improvements.

In July 2012, the FCC ruled that Verizon must stop charging users an added fee for using 4G smartphones and tablets as Wi-Fi hotspots (known as "tethering"). Verizon had been charging its customers, even those with "unlimited" plans, $20 per month for tethering. As part of the settlement, Verizon made a voluntary payment of $1.25 million to the U.S. Treasury.

In August 2012, the Department of Justice approved Verizon's purchase of Advanced Wireless Services (AWS) spectrum from a consortium of cable companies, including Comcast, Time Warner Cable and Bright House Networks, for $3.9 billion. Verizon began expanding its LTE network utilizing these extra airwaves in October 2013.

In December 2012, Verizon officially shut down V Cast and all of its components. Following this, Verizon introduced Viewdini, a TV and movie streaming app. They also made a deal with the NFL to have an app where people could watch live NFL events. This deal expired in 2017.

On June 5, 2013, The Guardian reported it had obtained an order by the Federal Bureau of Investigation (FBI) and approved by the United States Foreign Intelligence Surveillance Court that required Verizon to provide the NSA with telephone metadata for all calls originating in the U.S. Verizon Wireless was not part of the NSA data collection for wireless accounts due to foreign ownership issues.

In September 2013, Verizon purchased the 45% stake in Verizon Wireless, previously owned by Vodafone, for $130 billion. The deal closed on February 21, 2014, and became the third largest corporate deal ever signed, giving Verizon Communications sole ownership of Verizon Wireless.

On January 14, 2014, the DC Circuit Court of Appeals struck down the FCC's net neutrality rules after Verizon filed suit against them in January 2010. In June 2016, in a 184-page ruling, the United States Court of Appeals for the District of Columbia Circuit upheld, by a 2–1 vote, the FCC's net neutrality rules and the FCC's determination that broadband access is a public utility rather than a luxury. AT&T and the telecom industry said they would seek to appeal the decision to the Supreme Court.

On January 22, 2014, the Wall Street Journal reported that Verizon received more than 1,000 requests for information about its subscribers on national security grounds via National Security Letters. In total, Verizon received 321,545 requests from federal, state and local law enforcement for U.S. customer information. In May 2015, Verizon agreed to pay $90 million "to settle federal and state investigations into allegations mobile customers were improperly billed for premium text messages."

In late October 2014, Verizon Wireless launched the technology news website SugarString. The publication attracted controversy after it was reported that its writers were forbidden from publishing articles related to net neutrality or domestic surveillance. Although Verizon denied that this was the case, the site (described as being a pilot project) was shuttered in December.

In August 2015, Verizon launched Hum, a service and device offering vehicle diagnostic and monitoring tools for vehicles. On August 1, 2016, Verizon announced its acquisition of Fleetmatics, a fleet telematics system company in Dublin, Ireland, for $2.4 billion, to build products that it offers to enterprises for logistics and mobile workforces. On September 12, 2016, Verizon announced its acquisition of Sensity, a startup for LED sensors, in an effort to bolster its IoT portfolio.

In October 2016, Verizon was accused by Communications Workers of America of deliberately refusing to maintain its copper telephone service. The organization released internal memos and other documents stating that Verizon workers in Pennsylvania were being instructed to, in areas with network problems, migrate voice-only customers to VoiceLink, a system that delivers telephone service over the Verizon Wireless network, instead of repairing the copper lines. VoiceLink has limitations, including incompatibility with services or devices that require the transmission of data over the telephone line, and a dependency on battery backup in case of power failure. The memo warned that technicians who do not follow this procedure would be subject to "disciplinary action up to and including dismissal". A Verizon spokesperson responded to the allegations, stating that the company's top priority was to restore service to customers as quickly as possible, and that VoiceLink was a means of doing so in the event that larger repairs had to be done to the infrastructure. The spokesperson stated that it was "hard to argue with disciplining someone who intentionally leaves a customer without service".

In November 2016, Verizon acquired mapping startup SocialRadar, whose technology would be integrated with MapQuest.

On January 26, 2017, the Washington Post reported that Verizon was in talks to merge with Charter Communications.

In 2017, Verizon partnered with Alley to develop a number of coworking spaces under the name "Alley powered by Verizon".

On March 13, 2017, Verizon was sued by New York City for violating its cable franchise agreement, which required the provider to pass a fiberoptic network to all households in the city by June 30, 2014. Verizon disputed the claims, citing landlords not granting permission to install the equipment on their properties, and an understanding with the government that the fiber network would follow the same routes as its copper lines, and did not necessarily mean it would have to pass the lines in front of every property.

On April 27, 2017, Verizon invested $10 million in Renovo Auto, an autonomous vehicle company based in Campbell, California.

 was created in 2018, combining the individual Telematics, Fleetmatics, and Telogis units.

On December 10, 2018, Verizon announced that 10,400 managers had agreed to leave the company as part of a "voluntary separation program" offered to 44,000 employees, resulting in a cut of around 7% of its workforce. At the same time, the company announced a $4.6 billion write-off on its media division, citing "increased competitive and market pressures throughout 2018 that have resulted in lower-than-expected revenues and earning."

On January 17, 2019, Verizon announced that it would offer anti-spam and robocalling features free of charge to all customers beginning in March.

In April 2019, Verizon began rolling out its 5G mobile network, which was active in 30 cities by the end of the year. Unlike other U.S. carriers, Verizon only uses millimeter-wave (mmWave) spectrum for its 5G network. While capable of very high speeds, mmWave has limited range and poor building penetration.

On January 14, 2020, Verizon announced the launch of its privacy-focused search engine OneSearch.

On May 15, 2020, Verizon acquired videoconferencing service BlueJeans in order to expand its business portfolio offerings, particularly its unified communications offerings. While the price of the acquisition was not announced, it is believed to be in the sub $500 million range. The transaction is expected to close in the second quarter of 2020. 

In September 2020, Verizon announced its plans to acquire TracFone Wireless (a business unit of Mexican telecom business America Movil) for $6.25 billion. The deal was approved by the FCC on November 22, 2021 and closed the following day.

In October 2020, Verizon collaborated with Apple to bring 5G connectivity to Apple's iPhone 12 lineup.

Acquisition of AOL and Yahoo

On May 12, 2015, Verizon announced it would acquire AOL at $50 per share, for a deal valued around $4.4 billion. The following year, Verizon announced it would acquire the core internet business of Yahoo! for $4.83 billion. Following the completion of the acquisitions, Verizon created a new division called Oath, which includes the AOL and Yahoo brands. The sale did not include Yahoo's stakes in Alibaba Group and Yahoo! Japan.

On March 16, 2017, Verizon announced it would discontinue the e-mail services provided for its internet subscribers and migrate them to AOL Mail.

On May 23, 2017, Verizon CEO Lowell McAdam confirmed the company's plan to launch a streaming TV service. The integrated AOL-Yahoo operation, housed under the newly created Oath division, would be organized around key content-based pillars.

On June 13, 2017, Verizon completed its acquisition of Yahoo for $4.48 billion.

In May 2021, Verizon announced that its media group, including AOL and Yahoo, would be sold to Apollo Global Management for $5 billion, with Verizon retaining a 10% stake in the division.

Finances 
For the fiscal year 2019, Verizon reported earnings of US$19.265 billion, with an annual revenue of US$131.868 billion, an increase of 0.77% over the previous fiscal cycle. Verizon's shares traded at over $45 per share, and its market capitalization was valued at over US$229.1 billion in October 2018. For more than 20 years, Verizon has been in the top 20 in the Fortune 500 listings of corporations in the United States by total revenue.

States 

The company offers Internet, traditional landline phone or VoIP, Home Security, Premium Television, Web Hosting and wholesale data in nine states footprint across the eastern United States.

Marketing campaigns
Since its inception, Verizon Communications has run several marketing campaigns, including:

Can you hear me now?
The "Can you hear me now?" campaign, which was created for the newly formed Verizon Wireless, started running in 2001, and featured actor Paul Marcarelli in the role of "Test Man", a character based on a Verizon network tester, who travels the country asking "Can you hear me now?". The campaign, originally conceived by New York agency Bozell, ran from early 2001 to September 2010. Data from the technology tracking firm The Yankee Group showed that, in the early years of the campaign, net customers grew 10% to 32.5 million in 2002 and 15% more to 37.5 million in 2003. In addition, customer turnover dropped to 1.8% in 2001, down from 2.5% in 2000. In 2011, Marcarelli parted ways with Verizon, and is now a spokesperson for Sprint.

There's a map for that
The "There's a map for that" campaign was launched in late 2009, designed as a parody of AT&T's "There's an app for that" campaign. The ads depicted a side-by-side comparison of Verizon and AT&T network coverage maps. In early November 2009, AT&T filed a lawsuit in Atlanta federal court, claiming that the coverage maps being used in the ads were misleading. The suit was dropped later that month in conjunction with Verizon dropping a similar suit against AT&T.

That's not cool
In 2009, Verizon joined with the Ad Council, in partnership with the Family Violence Prevention Fund and the Office on Violence Against Women, to create the "That's not cool" public service advertising campaign. Designed to help teens recognize and prevent digital dating abuse, the ads were run on its Wireless' Mobile Web service, Verizon FiOS internet and TV.

Powerful Answers
In January 2013, Verizon launched the "Powerful Answers" campaign, designed by agency McGarryBowen. The campaign centered around a contest in which $10 million in prizes was offered to individuals for finding solutions to "the world's biggest challenges" by making use of Verizon's cloud, broadband and wireless networks. Winners of the inaugural competition were announced at the 2014 Consumer Electronics Show. Israel-based TinyTap won the education category; Smart Vision Labs of Newport, Rhode Island, won in the healthcare category; and Mosaic Inc. of Oakland, California, won in the sustainability category.

Inspire Her Mind
In June 2014, Verizon launched the "Inspire Her Mind" campaign, created by agency AKQA. It was designed to encourage girls' interest in science, technology, engineering and math, and aimed to address findings from the National Science Foundation, whose research showed that 66 percent of fourth-grade girls said they were interested science and math, yet only 18 percent of college students in engineering and math are women.

Flipside Stories (#NeverSettle)
In February 2015, Verizon launched its Flipside Stories ad campaign, featuring the #NeverSettle hashtag. The ads showed dramatized "testimonials" of people with and without Verizon Wireless or Verizon Fios services.

Better Matters 
In 2016, Verizon started using the slogan "Better Matters" in reference to its networks.

Humanability campaign
Verizon launched its Humanability campaign in 2017. The company aimed for the ads to showcase to consumers and investors its diversification of revenue sources and technology beyond smartphones. These include online advertising, data collection, Internet of Things, smart cities, telematics, and media.

Corporate governance

Executives
:
Hans Vestberg, chairman and CEO
Sowmyanarayan Sampath, head of Verizon Consumer
Kyle Malady, head of Verizon Business

Corporate responsibility
The Verizon Foundation is the philanthropic arm of Verizon Communications, which donates about $70 million per year to nonprofit organizations, with a focus on education, domestic violence prevention, and energy management. Verizon's educational initiatives have focused on STEM fields, including: a national competition for students to develop mobile application concepts; the Verizon Innovative Learning Schools program, providing professional development for teachers in underserved areas; and providing students with wireless hardware and services as part of President Obama's ConnectED program. The company also runs HopeLine, which has provided mobile phones to approximately 180,000 victims of domestic violence, and a program that offers grants for victims of domestic violence to start or grow home-based businesses. As part of an initiative to reduce the company's carbon intensity metrics by 50 percent by 2020, Verizon announced planned investment in solar panels and natural gas fuel cells at its facilities. The increased capacity would make Verizon the leading solar power producer among U.S. communications companies.

On February 5, 2019, Verizon first entered the green bond market with an issue of $1 billion. The sale was oversubscribed, meaning that investors bids were about $8 billion. Verizon plans to invest money on renewable energy, for instance, by developing solar and wind energy energy-efficient projects involving technology and equipment replacement, and the deployment of 5G wireless technologies, allowing for real-time response for energy demand (smart building management and city systems), green buildings, sustainable water management, and also biodiversity and conservation.

According to Cbonds, the newly issued green bonds have 3.875% coupon rate and will mature on August 5, 2029. Goldman Sachs and Bank of America Merrill Lynch were the bookrunners of the deal.

Criticism

Security concerns 
According to Google Project Zero researcher Tavis Ormandy, Verizon applies a simplistic certification methodology to give its "Excellence in Information Security Testing" award, e.g. to Comodo Group. It focuses on GUI functions instead of testing security relevant features. Not detected were Chromodo browser disabling of the same-origin policy, a VNC-delivered with a default of weak authentication, not enabling address space layout randomization (ASLR) when scanning, and using access control lists (ACLs) throughout its product.

Net neutrality 
Verizon and Comcast have been actively lobbying for current changes in the FCC's regulations that require internet service providers to offer all content at one internet speed regardless of the type of content since the early 2000s. In 2014, Verizon unsuccessfully sued the FCC for these powers.

In July 2017, it was reported that Verizon's mobile network had been limiting streaming services such as Netflix and YouTube to a speed of 10 Mbps; Verizon stated to Ars Technica that it had been testing a system to "optimize the performance of video applications on our network", and that it would not affect video quality.

Deceptive advertising of 5G 
In May 2020, the Better Business Bureau criticized Verizon for claiming it was "building the most powerful 5G experience for America" and recommended that the company make clear and conspicuous disclosures to consumers about the limited actual availability of its 5G network. Verizon had been cited by the Better Business Bureau in March 2019 for ads that "convey the message that Verizon has achieved the important milestone of deploying the first mobile wireless 5G network" prior to 5G availability, falsely conveying that the technology was currently available.

Privacy

Verizon has a one-star privacy rating from the Electronic Frontier Foundation.

Sponsorships and venues
Verizon is the title sponsor of several large performance and sports venues as well as a sponsor of many major sporting organizations.

National Hockey League
In January 2007, Verizon secured exclusive marketing and promotional rights with the National Hockey League. The deal was extended for another three years in 2012 and included new provisions for the league to provide exclusive content through Verizon's GameCenter app.

Motorsports
In 2009 and 2010 Verizon sponsored Justin Allgaier in the NASCAR Nationwide Series, before they chose to opt out of a two-year-old NASCAR team sponsorship with Penske Racing in order to pursue an expanded presence with the IndyCar Series. In March 2014 Verizon became title sponsor of the series through 2018.

Verizon also sponsored a race in the 2021 NASCAR Cup Series season, the Verizon 200 at the Brickyard at Indianapolis Motor Speedway.

National Football League
In late 2010, Verizon Communications joined with Vodafone Group in a joint partnership to replace Sprint as the official wireless telecommunications partner of the National Football League. The four-year deal was estimated at $720 million. In June 2013, Verizon announced a four-year extension with the NFL in a deal reportedly valued at $1 billion. The new agreement gave Verizon the right to stream every NFL regular-season and playoff game.

USA Team Handball
In January 2020, Verizon became a founding partner of USA Team Handball through the year 2020, with an option to extend the deal until 2024. They are the jersey sponsor for the men's and women's national handball team and the men's and women's national beach handball teams. They are presenter of the USA Team Handball College Nationals.

In 2020 USA Team Handball CEO Barry Siff that they are planning to create an American professional team handball league sponsored by Verizon. They are planning to have the owners until the end of 2020. They are planning to launch the league in 2023 with 10 teams with each team initially worth $3 million to $5 million and want to cooperate with NBA or NHL owners in one-tenant arena situations. To create multisports clubs like FC Barcelona or Paris Saint-Germain.

Venues
The main home concert hall of the Philadelphia Orchestra at the Kimmel Center for the Performing Arts is named Verizon Hall.

Verizon was the former sponsor for a number of sporting and entertainment arenas, including Simmons Bank Arena (formerly Verizon Arena) in North Little Rock, Arkansas, the Mayo Clinic Health System Event Center (formerly Verizon Center) in Mankato, Minnesota, and the SNHU Arena in Manchester, New Hampshire, which was originally known as the Verizon Wireless Arena until September 2016 when Southern New Hampshire University acquired the naming rights for a period of at least 10 years. Verizon was also the title sponsor of entertainment amphitheaters in locations throughout the United States, including four individually referred to as the "Verizon Wireless Amphitheatre" in Irvine, California, Maryland Heights, Missouri, Selma, Texas, and Alpharetta, Georgia.

Verizon is a former sponsor of the Capital One Arena in Washington, DC.

See also
 Verizon strike of 2016
 List of United States telephone companies

References

External links

Official website
Bell Operating Companies (from Bell System Memorial)

 
Bell System
Broadband
Cable television companies of the United States
Internet service providers of the United States
Mass media companies of the United States
Pay telephone operators of the United States
Telecommunications companies of the United States
Tier 1 networks
Video on demand
Telecommunications companies established in 1983
Mass media companies established in 1983
Companies based in New York City
Companies in the Dow Jones Industrial Average
Companies listed on the New York Stock Exchange
Publicly traded companies based in New York City
American companies established in 1983
2000 initial public offerings